{{Infobox royalty
| name         = Llywelyn ap Seisyll
| title        = King of the Britons"
| image        = 
| succession   = 
| reign        = 
| predecessor  = 
| successor    = Iago ab Idwal ap Meurig
| birth_date   = 
| birth_place  = 
| death_date   = 
| death_place  = 
| spouse       = Angharad ferch Maredudd
| issue        = Gruffydd ap Llywelyn
| father       = Seisyll
| mother       = 
}}

Llywelyn ap Seisyll (died 1023) was an 11th-century King of Gwynedd, Powys and Deheubarth. 

Llywelyn was the son of Seisyll, a man of whom little is known. Llewelyn first appears on record in 1018, the year he defeated and killed Aeddan ap Blegywryd, along with four of his sons and obtained Gwynedd and Powys.

In 1022, a man named Rhain the Irishman was made king of Deheubarth; he claimed to be a son of Maredudd ab Owain, whose daughter Angharad had married Llywelyn. Llywelyn made war against Rhain, they fought a battle at Abergwili in 1022, and, after a “slaughter on both sides”, Rhain was killed, allowing Llywelyn to take control of Deheubarth.

Llywelyn, after his success against Rhain, died in 1023. The Brut y Tywysogion'' portrays Llywelyn's reign as one of prosperity saying “complete in abundance of wealth and inhabitants; so that it was supposed there was neither poor nor destitute in all his territories, nor an empty hamlet, nor any deficiency.” Llywelyn was called "King of the Britons" by the Annals of Ulster.

Llywelyn's son, Gruffydd;, did not succeed his father, possibly because he was too young to do so. Gruffydd went on to become the first and only true King of Wales (the only one to rule over all the territory), however, he was killed by his own men in 1063. Gruffydd's own sons Maredudd and Idwal died in 1069, fighting at the Battle of Mechain.

As Llewelyn's grandfather is not known some scholars have said it was a man named Ednowain or Owain, others Rhodri. although a Seisyll son of Llywelyn of Buellt is mentioned in a tract of the Jesus College Ms.20 as a son of Ellelw daughter of a man named Elidir ap Llywarch of which Gruffudd ap Llywelyn and Llywelyn ap Seisyll are named in the latter part possibly implying Seisyll's father was a man named Llywelyn from Buellt and due to the connection of the family of Tegonwy ap Teon to said area e.g. the Iorwerthion it is plausible this Llywelyn is Llywelyn O'r Trallwng.

Further reading

Sources

1023 deaths
House of Dinefwr
Monarchs of Deheubarth
Monarchs of Gwynedd
11th-century Welsh monarchs
Year of birth unknown